Darbari Kanada, or simply Raga Darbari, (pronounced darbāri kānada), is a raga in the Kanada family, which is thought to have originated in Carnatic music and brought into Hindustani classical music by Miyan Tansen, the legendary 16th-century composer in emperor Akbar's court. This tradition is reflected in the name itself; Darbar is the Persian derived word in Hindi meaning "court." As the most familiar raga in the Kanada family, it may sometimes also be called Shuddha Kanada or pure Kanada. It belongs to the Asavari thaat. This raag is called raaga Kaanada in Yakshagana Karnataka state dance

It is also sometimes written as Durbari and Durbarikanada.

In Hindustani classical music 
Darbari is a grave raga, played deep into the night, considered to be one of the more difficult to master, and with the potential for profound emotional impact.
Darbari is a very serious raga and hence, slow and elaborate meend and andolan are generally more preferred than light and frivolous ornamentations like murki or khatka. The improvisation of Darbari is done more in the mandra saptak, or lower octave.

The ascension of arohana is in the lower and middle octaves. In the avarohana the note Ga (gandhar) komal is used in a slow vibrato (andolan) on this note. Similarly, komal Dha is also used by Andolan. The Andolan of komal Ga and komal Dha add to the gravity of the raga. The association of the notes Ni and Pa sounds pleasing. Its Vadi swara is Re and Samavadi is Pa.

arohana:  S R (R)g, (R)g M P d n S'

avarohana:  S' d n P M P (M)g, (M)g M (S)R, S

For reference, the set of notes in the Asavari thaat is S R g M P d n, and for Darbari, the role of the komal gandhar is crucial, as is dwelling on the lower komal dhaivat for some time.

Other ragas in the Kanada family include Nayaki Kanada, Abhogi Kanada, Shahana Kanada, Kaushi Kanada, Bageshree Kanada and Adana. (see Adana is part of the Kanada Raga group)

Important recordings
 Amir Khan, Raagaas Maarwa and Darbaari, Odeon LP (long-playing record), ODEON-MOAE 103, later reissued by HMV as EMI-EALP1253, critically regarded as a benchmark for both Maarwa and Darbaari.
 Pt. D. V. Paluskar, Jhanak Jhanakva More Bitchuwa, Golden Milestones, D. V. Paluskar. This is actually closer to raag Adaana than Darbaari. 
 East Atlanta rapper JID, samples the Darbaari raga on his song 151 Rum (song)

In Carnatic music 
It is an ubhaya vakra sampurna rāgam derived from the 20th melakarta rāgam Natabhairavi. Its ārohaṇa-avarohaṇa structure is as follows (see swaras in Carnatic music for details on the notations used):
ārohaṇa : 
avarohaṇa : 

This scale uses the notes chatusruti rishabham, sadharana gandharam, shuddha madhyamam, shuddha dhaivatham, kaisiki nishadham.

Compositions in Carnatic music 
Chandra chuda shiva shankara parvati by Purandara Dasa

Govardhana Giridhara by Narayana Teerthar

Nee ninaindhal by Periyasaami Thooran

Pâdodhi Kanyakâm by Kalyani Varadarajan

Devan ke pati Indra by Swathi Thirunal

Tum aur fareeb khaow by farida khanum

Film Songs

Language: Tamil

Language: Telugu

Language: Malayalam

See also

List of Film Songs based on Ragas

Notes

References

External links
 Film Songs in Rag Darbari Kanada 
More details about raga DarbariKanada

Kanb
Janya ragas